Jeffrey H. Meyer is a scientist and professor working with mood and anxiety disorders using neuroimaging at the Department of Psychiatry, University of Toronto. He is currently the head of the Neurochemical Imaging Program in Mood and Anxiety Disorders in the Brain Health Imaging Centre at the Campbell Family Mental Health Research Institute and is working as a Senior Scientist in the General and Health Systems Psychiatry Division at the Centre for Addiction and Mental Health. He has also been awarded with the Tier 1 Canada Research Chair in the Neurochemistry of Major Depression.

Meyer has experience in working with positron emission tomography, including the use of [11C]DASB, [11C]harmine, [18F]FEPPA, [18F]setoperone, [11C]raclopride, [18F]SynVesT1, and [11C]SL25.1188 radioligands to examine neuropsychiatric disorders.

Areas of research  
Meyer focuses on reducing the impact of clinical depression on society through his psychiatric research. Two aspects of such research are:
 Developing new strategies to overcome treatment resistant depression: For example, treatment resistance is associated with comorbidity. Meyer conducts neuroimaging studies to understand the relationship between treatment-resistant depression and common comorbid illnesses (e.g., SARS-CoV-2 infection, obsessive-compulsive disorder, borderline personality disorder, anorexia nervosa, and traumatic brain injury)
 Preventing the development of major depressive episodes: By identifying biological markers associated with the onset of the mood disorders, new approaches can be taken to increase resiliency against such changes
In recent years, Meyer has mainly been involved in research related to neuroinflammation (e.g., markers of microglial and astroglial activation), monoamine oxidase, and markers of synaptic density. He typically conducts his research on psychiatric illness by using neuroimaging, but he also utilizes related markers when taking preclinical approaches to his research. He has also been working with early phase trials of new potential therapeutics (e.g., administering small doses of therapeutics that target pathological markers of depression in phase 0 trials), as well as creating new peripheral biomarkers that are known to be associated with certain mood disorders. He has been looking to develop natural health products that target symptoms of depression—relevant programs that he has been running include reducing the effects of depressive symptoms that are often associated with early postpartum and perimenopause.

Scientific contributions 
Notable discoveries that Meyer has made in the field of psychiatric research include:
 Discovering a strong presence of neuroinflammation (i.e., gliosis) in those who are experiencing major depressive episodes and that this inflammation in the brain has the potential to worsen over a longer duration if left untreated
 Using both natural antioxidants and monoamine precursors to create a dietary supplement that is shown to prevent the occurrence of depressed mood associated with postpartum blues—a syndrome that may lead to the development of postpartum depression—in open-label trials
 Discovering evidence of elevated levels of monoamine oxidase A in those who are going through early postpartum or perimenopause, as well as those who are experiencing intense emotional states associated with a higher risk for developing major depressive episodes, including: Being unable to control the consumption of alcohol, being in the early stages of nicotine withdrawal, and having a diagnosis of borderline personality disorder
 Discovering a pattern of elevated levels of monoamine oxidase A in those who are experiencing major depressive episodes
 Discovering a pattern of elevated levels of monoamine oxidase B in those with major depressive disorder—specifically in the prefrontal regions of the brain
 Discovering a strong presence of neuroinflammation—specifically in the implicated cortico-striatal-thalamo-cortical circuit located in the brain—in adults with obsessive-compulsive disorder
 Finding evidence that shows how selective serotonin reuptake inhibitors (i.e., antidepressants) produce 80% occupancy for their target site
 Finding a correlation between seasonal variation and serotonin transporter binding—binding is shown to increase during the winter season, compared to the summer season
 Finding patterns of elevated serotonin 2 receptor and striatal dopamine 2 receptor binding in both the prefrontal and anterior cingulate cortex—especially in those who score higher in targeted symptom clusters—in those with major depressive disorder who have remained medication-free for an extended period, and that serotonin 2 receptor binding decreases in those who take antidepressants that raise serotonin levels—this implies that it may be more effective to administer therapeutics that target specific subtypes of serotonin 2 receptors (e.g., psilocybin) prior to taking antidepressants that raise serotonin levels

Awards 
Meyer has received many awards for his contributions to psychiatric research, some of which include:
 The AE Bennett Award from the Society of Biological Psychiatry
 The Distinguished Investigator Award from Brain and Behavior Research Foundation
 The Innovations in Psychiatry and Young Investigator Awards from the Canadian College of Neuropsychopharmacoloy
 The Samarthji Lal Award from the Graham Boeckh Foundation
 The John Dewan Prize from the Ontario Mental Health Foundation
 The Royal College Medal Award in Medicine for outstanding contributions to psychiatric research

References

External links 
 https://web.archive.org/web/20060619202239/http://utpsychiatry.ca/dirsearch.asp?id=919
 https://www.camh.ca/en/science-and-research/science-and-research-staff-directory/jeffreymeyer

Year of birth missing (living people)
Living people
Canadian neuroscientists
Academic staff of the University of Toronto
20th-century Canadian scientists
21st-century Canadian scientists